Mitchell Hamline School of Law is a private law school in Saint Paul, Minnesota.  It is accredited by the American Bar Association (ABA) and offers full- and part-time legal education for its Juris Doctor (J.D.) degree.

History 
Mitchell Hamline was formed on December 9, 2015, when Hamline University School of Law merged into William Mitchell College of Law.  Prior to merging into Mitchell Hamline, William Mitchell itself was the product of the merger of several other law schools, all in the Twin Cities. Mark C. Gordon served as the founding dean of Mitchell Hamline before stepping down in 2019.

Profile, tuition, rankings, and employment
In Fall of 2022 Mitchell Hamline accepted 65% of the applications it received; 55% of those who were accepted, or 341 students, enrolled.  The median LSAT for students starting in Fall 2022 was 152, while the median GPA was 3.33; 69% of students enrolled in the part time track. In total, the school has 1,211 students, 58% of whom are women, 7% of whom are Hispanic, and 8% of whom are Black.

Annual tuition (including fees) for the 2022–23 academic year was $50,748 for full-time students and $36,900 for part-time students.

The school was ranked by U.S. News & World Report between 147th and 193rd in the country (bottom 25%) in 2023. Mitchell Hamline was ranked ninth in the nation in dispute resolution.

Of 331 students who graduated in 2021, 41.7% found full-time long-term employment that requires a JD within nine months of graduation.  Of the 180 Mitchell Hamline graduates who took the Minnesota bar exam for the first time in 2021, 120 passed, for a 66.67% pass rate, 12.81% below the pass rate for all ABA approved law school graduates taking the Minnesota bar (79.48%), 13.43% below the pass rate for University of St. Thomas School of Law (80.1%) and 29.03% below the pass rate for the University of Minnesota Law School (95.7%). Of the 309 Mitchell Hamline graduates who took any state's bar exam in 2021, only 59.55% passed.

Academics

Dispute Resolution Institute 
Mitchell Hamline houses an institute dedicated to alternative forms of dispute resolution. The institute offers a mediation center and four certificates. The institute also selects qualified students to study conflict resolution through two study abroad programs: an international business perspective in England through a partnership with Queen Mary University of London, as well as a through a lens of religious conflict in Israel in partnership with the Hebrew University of Jerusalem.

Health Law Institute 
Mitchell Hamline's Health Law Institute offers specialized courses and experiential learning. Students are exposed to real-life health law issues. The institute offers four certificates, some of which satisfy the requirements to sit for the Compliance Certification Board's (CCB) national exam. Mitchell Hamline students are able to build this education into their J.D. program, while non-law-students can complete the certificate online.

Indian Law Program 
The Indian Law Program emphasizes practical legal education with faculty who have spent their careers working with Indian tribes.

Joint degree programs 
Mitchell Hamline offers two types of joint degrees: The 3+3 and the Dual Degrees.

The 3+3 programs enable eligible students from select Minnesota universities to complete their bachelor's and J.D. degrees in only six years, rather than the more common seven. It currently has agreements with Hamline University, St. Cloud State University, and Bemidji State University.

Dual degree programs allow J.D. holders to combine their law degree with an additional graduate degree, and earn both in less time than normal. Most programs require four years to obtain both the J.D. and the master's degree. Through a partnership with Hamline University, students can also earn a Master of Business Administration (M.B.A.), a Master of Fine Arts in Writing (M.F.A.), a Master in Public Administration (M.P.A.), or a Master in Nonprofit Management (M.N.M.).

Blended learning 
In the early 2000s the American Bar Association's Task Force on the Future of Legal Education drafted a recommendation that law schools be permitted to experiment and innovate. At that time, Mitchell Hamline was still William Mitchell College of Law. The school's first cohort of hybrid students included 85 students, 14 of whom already held M.B.A.s, 5 held M.D.s, and three held PhDs. The students ranged in age from 22 to 67 and represented 30 states and two countries.

In Fall 2020, the school started to offer blended learning. This includes elements of the Hybrid, Executive, and Weekend offerings. It is a four-year program that can be finished in three years. On-campus time includes a case-study workshop in which students learn from lawyers and participants in cases.

Student journals 
Mitchell Hamline students can participate in several academic journals, including the flagship Mitchell Hamline Law Review; Cybaris, an Intellectual Property Law Review; and the Mitchell Hamline Journal of Public Policy and Practice.

Externships 
The school offers more practical externships than any other school in the Upper Midwest.

Notable alumni 

The law library on campus is named in honor of Warren E. Burger, the fifteenth Chief Justice of the United States, who graduated from one of the school's predecessor institutions, St. Paul College of Law.

Other notable graduates include:

 August Andresen, former United States Congressman
 Joe Atkins, Minnesota State Representative
Elmer A. Benson, former United States Senator and Governor of Minnesota
Bobby Joe Champion, Minnesota State Representative
Ray P. Chase, former United States Congressman
Tarryl Clark, former Minnesota State Senator
Richard Cohen, Minnesota State Senator
Roger L. Dell, former Chief Justice of the Minnesota Supreme Court
Sean Duffy, United States Congressman from Wisconsin
Tom Emmer, Unites States Congressman from Minnesota
William T. Francis, former U.S. Ambassador to Liberia
Sam Hanson, former Justice of the Minnesota Supreme Court
Duchess Harris, professor at  Macalester College
Debra Hilstrom, Minnesota State Representative
Dewey W. Johnson, former United States Congressman
Matthew E. Johnson, Chief Judge, Minnesota Court of Appeals
Jim Lord, Minnesota politician
Myles Mace, former Distinguished Professor, Harvard Business School
Eric J. Magnuson, former Chief Justice of the Minnesota Supreme Court
Paul A. Magnuson, Senior Judge, U.S. District Court for the District of Minnesota
John J. McDonough, former Mayor of Saint Paul
Fred McNeill, former Minnesota Vikings player
Robert W. Mattson, Jr., former Minnesota State Auditor
Pat Mazorol, Minnesota State Representative
Helen Meyer, Justice of the Minnesota Supreme Court
Ted Mondale, former Minnesota State Senator and former chairman of the Metropolitan Council
 William P. Murphy, former Justice of the Minnesota Supreme Court
Arthur E. Nelson, former United States Senator
Martin A. Nelson, former Justice of the Minnesota Supreme Court
Scott Newman, Minnesota State Senator
Floyd B. Olson, former Governor of Minnesota
Peter S. Popovich, former Chief Justice of the Minnesota Supreme Court
Joey San Nicolas, Attorney General for the Northern Mariana Islands
John B. Sanborn, Jr., former Judge, U.S. Court of Appeals for the Eighth Circuit
Thomas D. Schall, former United States Senator
Linda Scheid, former Minnesota State Senator
Gary J. Schmidt, former Wisconsin State Assemblyman
Corey Stewart, former candidate for Governor and Lt. Governor of Virginia, chair, Board of Supervisors, Prince William County, Virginia
Lena O. Smith, Minnesota's first African-American female lawyer
Esther Tomljanovich, former Justice of the Minnesota Supreme Court
Robert Vanasek, former Speaker of the Minnesota House of Representatives
Robert Vogel, former U.S. Attorney for the District of North Dakota and Justice of the North Dakota Supreme Court
Jean Wagenius, Minnesota State Representative
Rosalie E. Wahl, former Justice of the Minnesota Supreme Court
Torrey Westrom, Minnesota State Senator

Luther Youngdahl, former Governor of Minnesota, Justice of the Minnesota Supreme Court, and Judge of the U.S. District Court for the District of Columbia
Oscar Youngdahl, former United States Congressman
G. Aaron Youngquist, former Minnesota Attorney General and Assistant U.S. Attorney General

References

External links
 
 

 
Educational institutions established in 2015
Hamline University
2015 establishments in Minnesota
Private universities and colleges in Minnesota